Lixi  is a town in Yingde City, Qingyuan, north Guangdong Province, China.

See also
List of township-level divisions of Guangdong

References

Township-level divisions of Guangdong